Doulos SIL (Ancient Greek for "slave") is a serif typeface developed by SIL International, very similar to Times or Times New Roman. Unlike Times New Roman, Doulos only has a single face, Regular. The goal of its design according to the SIL International website is to "provide a single Unicode-based font family that would contain a comprehensive inventory of glyphs needed for almost any Roman- or Cyrillic-based writing system, whether used for phonetic or orthographic needs."  Along with Charis SIL and Gentium, it is licensed under the SIL Open Font License (OFL). This font has a cousin specially designed for numbered musical notation named Doulos SIL Cipher.

References

External links
Doulos SIL Font Home
Doulos SIL Cipher Font
Smart Unicode typefaces released under free license,

IPA typefaces
Free software Unicode typefaces